Gresley railway station was a railway station at Castle Gresley, Derbyshire on the Leicester to Burton upon Trent Line.

History
The line was built for the Midland Railway and the station opened on 2 October 1848. Originally sited to the west of the road bridge, the station was resited to the east of the bridge . Gresley station was closed on 7 September 1964 but the line remains open for freight traffic.

From 1906 to 1927, a branch of the Burton and Ashby Light Railway terminated at the station.

In the 1990s BR planned to restore passenger services between Leicester and Burton as the second phase of its Ivanhoe Line project. However, after the privatisation of British Rail in 1995 this phase of the project was discontinued. In 2009 the Association of Train Operating Companies published a £49 million proposal to restore passenger services to the line that would include reopening a station at Gresley to serve the town of Swadlincote.

Stationmasters

John Burn until 1862
W. Renals from 1862 - ca. 1868 (afterwards station master at Leagrave)

H. Learoyd until 1871
Albert C. Bickham 1871
S.N. Rose 1871 - 1873
W. Cook 1873 - 1875
T. Perkins 1875 - 1880
J. Sandford 1880 - 1881 (formerly station master at Moira)
H. Wright 1881 - 1885
T. Washbourne 1885 - 1903
William Marston 1903 - 1915
Percy Jackson 1927 - 1931 (afterwards station master at Wilnecote)
E.B. Bridge 1931 - 1937 (afterwards station master at Bagworth)
A.H. Malbon 1937 - 1938 (formerly station master at Chellaston)
F.N. Crook 1938 - 1939
R.C. White from 1939 (formerly station master at Chellaston)
R. Marsden ca. 1949 ca. 1953
C.D. Pheasant ca. 1958

References

Former Midland Railway stations
Disused railway stations in Derbyshire
Railway stations in Great Britain opened in 1848
Railway stations in Great Britain closed in 1869
Railway stations in Great Britain opened in 1869
Railway stations in Great Britain closed in 1964
Proposed railway stations in England
1849 establishments in England
Beeching closures in England